Neocollyris fruhstorferi is a species of ground beetle in the genus Neocollyris in the family Carabidae. It was described by Horn in 1902.

References

Fruhstorferi, Neocollyris
Beetles described in 1902